Cotton Collegiate Government Higher Secondary School is an institution for high school education located in the heart of Guwahati, Assam, a northeastern state of India. It is the first school in the state.

The school was established in the year 1835. It is the oldest school in the entire North-East India. Mr Singer was the first headmaster of the school.

Courses

 Class VI(Six) to Class X(Ten) under Board of Secondary Education, Assam (SEBA).
 Two year higher Secondary Course in Arts, Science, Commerce and Vocational stream under Assam Higher Secondary Education Council (AHSEC).

Facilities

Co-Curricular & Others 

 Atal Tinkering Lab
 NSQF compliant vocational subjects of IT/ITeS and Retail from Class IX to XII along with IT and Retail Lab.
 BLISS.
 Tele-Education.
 ICT @ School.
 NCC (ARMY & NAVY)
 Scout & Guide.
 Well equipped library.
 Legal Cell.
 School Magazine-“Pragjyoti”

Sports 

Annual sports are observed as per academic calendar of SEBA and AHSEC. The school encourages and motivates also trains for participating in Indoor and Outdoor Games, Debate and Quiz, Literary and Cultural competitions.

References

High schools and secondary schools in Assam
Schools in Guwahati
Educational institutions established in 1834
1834 establishments in India